Ágota Sebő (born May 7, 1934, in Budapest) is a former freestyle swimmer from Hungary.

At the European Championships she won two gold medals in 1954. She retired from swimming in 1958 and later she was coach of the Hungarian modern pentathlon team.

References

1934 births
Living people
Hungarian female swimmers
Hungarian female freestyle swimmers
Swimmers from Budapest
European Aquatics Championships medalists in swimming